To a Frown is the first studio album by American sludge metal band Buzzov*en, originally released through Allied Recordings in 1993. The album is now out of print, although it is available in a remastered form in its entirety on the compilation album Welcome to Violence.

Track listing
All songs written and arranged by Buzzov*en.
"Intro" - 0:06
"To a Frown" – 3:28
"Shove" – 2:12
"Drained" – 5:22
"Forget It" – 2:30
"Frayed" – 3:38
"Splinter My Eye" – 2:04
"Wound" – 4:06
"Toe Fry" – 2:39
"Aching Improv #9" – 3:42
"Weeding" – 17:48

Personnel
Kirk – vocals, electric guitar, Vox Continental  Organ
Igor – bass guitar
Ash – drums
Billy Anderson – engineering, production
Pat Grimple – backing vocals on "Shove" and "Splinter My Eye"
Harvey Bennett Stafford – cover painting

References

Buzzoven albums
1993 debut albums
Albums produced by Billy Anderson (producer)